Al-Nizamiyya of Baghdad, one of the first nezamiyehs, was established in 1065.  In July 1091, Nizam al-Mulk appointed the 33-year-old Al-Ghazali as a professor of the school. Offering free education, it has been described as the "largest university of the Medieval world". Ibn Tumart, founder of the Berber Almohad dynasty, reputedly attended the school and studied under al-Ghazali. Nizam al-Mulk's son-in-law Mughatil ibn Bakri was also employed by the school. In 1096, when al-Ghazali left the nezamiyeh, it housed 3000 students. In 1116, Muhammad al-Shahrastani taught at the nezamiyeh. In the 1170s, statesman Beha Ud-Din taught at the nezamiyeh, before he moved on to teach in Mosul.

The Persian poet Sa'di studied at the nezamiyeh from 1195 until 1226, when he set out on a thirty-year journey. He was also among those who witnessed first-hand accounts of its destruction by Mongol Ilkhanate invaders led by Hulagu during the Sack of Baghdad in the year 1258. Sa'di recalls clearly his days of studies at Al-Nizamiyya in Baghdad: "A fellow-student at Nizamiah displayed malevolence towards me, and I informed my tutor, saying: 'Whenever I give more proper answers than he the envious fellow becomes offended.' The professor replied: 'The envy of thy friend is not agreeable to thee, but I know not who told thee that back-biting was commendable. If he seek perdition through the path of envy, thou wilt join him by the path of slander.'"

The curriculum initially focused on religious studies, Islamic law, Arabic literature, and arithmetic, and later extended to history, mathematics, the physical sciences, and music.

See also
 Abu Ishaq al-Shirazi
 Nizamiyya
 Mustansiriya School, another Baghdad school, founded in 1233
 Madrasah
 Islamic Golden Age

References
Makdisi, George: "Madrasa and University in the Middle Ages", Studia Islamica, No. 32 (1970), pp. 255–264

Schools in Iraq
Education in Baghdad
Educational institutions established in the 11th century
11th-century establishments in the Abbasid Caliphate
Baghdad under the Abbasid Caliphate
1065 establishments
Education in the medieval Islamic world